Mnemosyne (minor planet designation: 57 Mnemosyne) is a large main belt asteroid. It is a stony S-type asteroid in composition. This object was discovered by Robert Luther on 22 September 1859 from Düsseldorf. Its name was chosen by Martin Hoek, director of the Utrecht Observatory, in reference to Mnemosyne, a Titaness in Greek mythology.

The orbital plane is inclined at an angle of 15.2° to the ecliptic. The orbital period of this asteroid is close to a 2:1 commensurability with Jupiter, which made it useful for perturbation measurements to derive the mass of the planet.

Subsequent observations at Organ Mesa Observatory in 2019 showed this period was not a good fit to a longer light curve.

References

External links
 
 

Background asteroids
Mnemosyne
Mnemosyne
S-type asteroids (Tholen)
S-type asteroids (SMASS)
18590922